Forty Days or 40 Days may refer to:

Christianity

Forty days in the desert, the Temptation of Christ

Books
The Forty Days of Musa Dagh, a 1933 novel by Franz Werfel

Music
40 Days, an album by The Wailin' Jennys, 2004
"40 Days", a song by Blessthefall from Awakening, 2011
"Forty Days", a song by Ronnie Hawkins 1959 and the cover of "Thirty Days" by Chuck Berry
"Forty Days and Forty Nights", a song by Muddy Waters, 1956
"Forty Days and Nights", a song by The Rankin Family, 1996
"40 Days", a song by Slowdive from Souvlaki, 1993
"40 Days", an instrumental song by Dave Brubeck, 1965
"Forty Days", a song by Streetlight Manifesto from Somewhere in the Between, 2007